20 minutes may refer to:

20 minutes (France), a newspaper
20 minutes (Switzerland), a French-language newspaper

See also
20 Dakika ( "20 Minutes"), a 2013 Turkish television series
20 Minuten, a Swiss German-language newspaper
20 minutos, a Spanish newspaper